Trachycardium isocardia, the West Indian prickly cockle, is a species of bivalve mollusc in the family Cardiidae. It can be found along coast of the West Indies.

References

Cardiidae
Molluscs described in 1758
Taxa named by Carl Linnaeus